The Crimson Avenger (Lee Walter Travis) is a superhero published by DC Comics. He first appeared in Detective Comics #20 (October 1938). He is the first superhero and costume hero published in Detective Comics. He preceded Batman, and appeared in the same year after Action Comics #1 debuted characters like Superman, which led to the Golden Age of Comic Books. He is sometimes depicted as one of the first masked heroes within the fictional DC Universe. He is also known as a founding member of DC's second depicted superhero team, Seven Soldiers of Victory. After his death, his legacy name lives on other characters.

Publication history
The Crimson Avenger (along with his sidekick Wing) first appeared in the DC Comics anthology American comic book series Detective Comics in issue #20.
The Crimson Avenger had many similarities to The Green Hornet, including a sidekick named Wing who was an Asian valet, and a gas gun that he used to subdue opponents. In his early appearances he dressed in a red trenchcoat, a fedora, with a red mask covering his face; except for the red, he was visually similar to The Shadow. Later, when superheroes became more popular than costumed vigilantes, his costume was changed to a more standard superhero outfit, consisting of red tights, yellow boots, trunks and crest, and a "sun" symbol which was revealed in 2003 to be a stylized bullet hole.

The character continued appearing in Detective Comics until issue #89 (July 1944).

According to Jess Nevins' Encyclopedia of Golden Age Superheroes, "most of his opponents are ordinary, but there is the Boss and his zombies, the occasional mad scientist, and some name villains like Echo, Methuselah, and the crime genius the Brain".

In 1941, the Crimson Avenger joined the Seven Soldiers of Victory, a second superteam styled after the popular Justice Society of America appearing in All-Star Comics. The Seven Soldiers debuted in Leading Comics #1 (December 1941), and continued until #14 (March 1945).

Fictional character biography

Origin
Two separate accounts of the Crimson Avenger's origins have been printed which complement each other in some areas, but contradict in others. The first origin story appeared in Secret Origins #5 (August 1986), and was written by Roy Thomas, with art by Gene Colan. Taking place in late October 1938, it depicts Lee Walter Travis, the young publisher of the Globe-Leader, a paper devoted to progressive causes. At a costume ball on Halloween, Travis appears in a "highway robber" costume. This is the night of Orson Welles' famous broadcast of The War of the Worlds and — having gotten advance notice of the radio show — a group of criminals dressed in alien-like costumes take advantage of the ensuing panic to rob the party guests. The villains murder a young journalist and Travis is enraged, going after the costumed thieves and exchanging gunfire. Travis drives the thieves into a ditch and disappears before the police arrive, now inspired to become the Crimson Avenger. The use of Orson Welles' War of the Worlds in the story was inspired by the fact that the Crimson Avenger's first comic book appearance was dated Oct 1938, the same month as the radio broadcast.

The second, extended origin appeared in Golden Age Secret Files & Origins #1 (2001). In this tale Lee Travis was a war-weary man of the world trying to forget the horrors of the Wars and seek some inner peace of mind. To this end he briefly settled in the mystical far-East city of Nanda Parbat. There, he was shown the future career of Superman by the goddess Rama Kushna. Superman's deeds and selflessness inspired Lee to rededicate his own talents, and Superman's death at the hands of Doomsday galvanized Lee to spend his life honoring Superman's memory, years before he was even born. When Lee returned to civilization, he found that nearly ten years had gone by for the rest of the world, at which point he took to the streets as the Crimson, and later the Crimson Avenger.

Superman's appearance as the first costumed hero in Action Comics #1 is credited as the beginning of the Golden Age of Comics, but this was removed from continuity during the Crisis on Infinite Earths. The Crimson's second origin re-establishes Superman as the inspiration for all costumed crime-fighters.

1988 mini series
In 1988, the Crimson Avenger appeared in a 4-issue miniseries by Roy & Dann Thomas, Greg Brooks, and Mike Gustovich. Set shortly after the Crimson's debut in the latter days of 1938, the story revolves around the growing global hostilities, as Japan advances through China, Germany moves into eastern Europe, and the soon-to-be-Allies hesitation to act. The Crimson finds himself in the middle of a plot he doesn't quite grasp, with enigmatic foreign women, strange objects, and shadowy conspirators weaving around him.

This series was a 50th anniversary celebration of the character's debut and of all mystery-men in general.

Final days
In a one shot story named "Whatever Happened to the Crimson Avenger?" featured in DC Comics Presents #38 (October 1981), Lee Travis finds out that he is suffering from an incurable terminal disease. In his hospital room brooding on his situation, Travis spots a ship blinking SOS with its lights. Travis dons his suit one last time and heads out to investigate. He discovers the ship was taken over by criminals seeking to steal its cargo of explosively unstable chemical waste and the captain was trying to summon help. Travis engages the criminals but is unable to prevent a grenade from starting a fire that threatens to cause a massive explosion. Knowing he is dying anyway, the Avenger makes the crew abandon ship while he pilots the ship to a safe distance and is presumably killed, with the satisfaction he is going out heroically and spectacularly (it is later revealed that the explosion was orchestrated by the Ultra Humanite). When the crew reach the shore and are asked by the police who saved them, the captain says he never saw the face of the man. It can be assumed that nobody actually knew where Lee Travis had disappeared to or that the Crimson Avenger was responsible for saving the city, although his name is remembered by a young Hispanic woman whose child he saved from a fall on his way to investigate the tanker.

Legacy
The legend of the Crimson Avenger does not die, however, due to an early good deed that night. On his way to the tanker, he saves a young boy who has fallen out of an apartment window and returns the child to his mother. The woman promises to tell her son of the man who saved him once he is old enough to remember.

Grant Morrison has established that in various Justice League stories, the original mask, hat and cloak of the Crimson Avenger are used in a special ritual whenever a new member joins the JLA, in honor of him being, in the Martian Manhunter's words, "the first of our kind".

Infinite Frontier

The New Golden Age
In the pages of "The New Golden Age", Crimson Avenger's sacrifice remains intact. Clock King used Per Degaton's time machine to bring the ship that Crimson Avenger was on to the present. Before Stargirl destroyed the time machine to send the ship back to its own time, Crimson Avenger told Stargirl to find Wing. Once the ship was back in its own time, Crimson Avenger's body was found and there was a memorial held by the Justice League and the Justice Society of America.

Powers and abilities
Though possessing no super-powers, the Crimson Avenger was an Olympic-level athlete and highly skilled hand-to-hand combatant able to hold his own against almost any foe. In the early days of his career, the Avenger used a gas gun of his own design, capable of rendering his opponents unconscious. The Crimson Avenger's calling card was a cloud of crimson smoke through which he made a most dramatic entrance.

Other versions

Elseworlds
In Michael Uslan's Elseworlds title Batman: Detective No. 27, the Crimson Avenger appears as part of an order of detectives including Alfred Pennyworth and Sam Spade; Crimson attempts to recruit Bruce Wayne.

The League of Extraordinary Gentlemen
In The League of Extraordinary Gentlemen: Black Dossier, the Crimson Avenger is briefly mentioned as having met with Allan Quatermain and Mina Murray during the two's self-exile from Britain during the years of the Ingsoc government. A photo of Allan and Murray standing in front of the Crimson Avenger's second costume is shown.

Fishnet Femmes Fatales
The Crimson Avenger makes an appearance in the Justice League of America 80-Page Giant #1 comic (November 2009) in a story titled Zatanna & Black Canary in Fishnet Femmes Fatales!, when the two heroines are tossed back in time by the supervillain Epoch.

Earth 2
In September 2011, The New 52 rebooted DC's continuity. In this new timeline, Lee Travis is now a female African American reporter, borrowing features from the original Crimson Avenger's successor, Jill Carlyle. She first appears in Earth 2 #5, but is not named until two issues later.

In other media

 The Crimson Avenger makes primarily non-speaking cameo appearances in Justice League Unlimited, voiced by an uncredited Kevin Conroy in the episode "This Little Piggy". This version is a member of the Justice League.
 The Crimson Avenger appears in issue #33 of the comic book tie-in Justice League Adventures, in which he is revealed to be among the oldest members of the Justice League who began fighting crime sometime after the 1930s.
 The Crimson Avenger appears in a photograph depicted in the Stargirl episode "Brainwave". This version is a member of the Seven Soldiers of Victory.

Further reading
 "The Crimson Avenger: DC Comics' First Masked Hero" by Ian Millsted, Back Issue (vol. 3) #106 (August 2018), pg 56-59

References

External links
 Beek's Books Crimson Avenger mini-series review

DC Comics superheroes
Fictional characters from parallel universes
Fictional detectives
Comics characters introduced in 1938
Golden Age superheroes